Luigi Moccagatta (9 October 1809 – 6 September 1891) was an Italian missionary who mainly preached in Qing China.

Biography
Luigi Moccagatta was born in Castellazzo Bormida, Province of Alessandria, Italy, on 9 October 1809. He joined the Franciscans in 1826, at the age of 16. He was ordained a priest in 1832. 

He became coadjutor bishop of the Roman Catholic Archdiocese of Jinan in 1844, and succeeded Bishop Lodovico Maria (dei Conti) Besi as bishop of the Roman Catholic Archdiocese of Jinan in 1848. He rebuilt the Cathedral of the Immaculate Conception, Taiyuan in 1870. On 27 September 1870, he became bishop of Roman Catholic Archdiocese of Taiyuan. Because of his old age and illness, his nephew Gregorio Grassi was appointed coadjutor bishop in 1876 to take charge of the administration of the archdiocese instead of him. He died of illness on 6 September 1891, aged 81.

References

External links
Bishop St. Francesco Antonio Domenico Fogolla, O.F.M. †

1809 births
1891 deaths
People from Castellazzo Bormida
Italian Roman Catholic bishops